Malaysia–Uzbekistan relations refers to a foreign relations between the two countries, Malaysia and Uzbekistan. Malaysia has an embassy in Tashkent, and Uzbekistan has an embassy in Ampang, Selangor. Both countries maintain good relations.

History 
Bilateral diplomatic relations were established in 1992 with Malaysia opened its embassy in Tashkent in 1993. Since 1992, the President of Uzbekistan Islam Karimov has made several visits to Southeast Asian countries such as Malaysia and Indonesia which were part of his longest trip abroad.

Economic relations 
Both countries are developing ties in the areas of economic and investment co-operation, oil and gas, education and tourism. Many Malaysian investors also has started doing business in Uzbekistan. In 2012, following the 20 years friendship relations between both countries, a Malaysian and Uzbekistan Friendship Association (MAUFA) has been establish. The association also establish a joint projects in the field of educational tourism, photo-tourism, students exchange, mass-media and ICT. In 2011, many of the joint projects operates in Uzbekistan, particularly in the oil and gas industry, manufacture of textiles, furniture and electrical products. Uzbekistan is also keen to learn from Malaysia on the tourism industry.

Further reading 
 Uzbekistan, Malaysia Mark 20th Anniversary Of Diplomatic Relations
 Strengthening relations between Malaysia and Uzbekistan

References 

 
Uzbekistan
Bilateral relations of Uzbekistan